Spain women's national floorball team is the national team of Spain. At the 2005 Floorball Women's World Championship in Singapore, the team finished eighth in the B-Division. At the 2007 Floorball Women's World Championship in Frederikshavn, Denmark, the team finished tenth in the B-Division.

References 

Women's national floorball teams
Floorball